Hobo is the third album by American actor and singer-songwriter Billy Bob Thornton.  It was released by Big Deal Records in 2005.

The song "Your Blue Shadow" was originally featured on his album Private Radio.

Track listing
 "Hobo"
 "I Used to Be a Lion"
 "The Late Great Golden State"
 "El Centro on Five Dollars a Day"
 "Purple Passion"
 "Your Blue Shadow"
 "Orange County Suicide"
 "Smooth Me Over"
 "At Least We Dreamed"
 "Gray Walls"

Trivia

During the filming of his movie The Astronaut Farmer in Santa Fe, New Mexico, Thornton held a "One stop publicity tour" (his words) for the movie and the album.

References

2005 albums
Billy Bob Thornton albums